Eshkhal (also Romanized as Eshkhāl; also known as Ishkhal, Shekhāl, and Sheykhal) is a village in Gavork-e Nalin Rural District, Vazineh District, Sardasht County, West Azerbaijan Province, Iran. At the 2006 census, its population was 269, in 45 families.

References 

Populated places in Sardasht County